Aushiri (Auxira, Vacacocha) is an extinct Zaparoan language formerly spoken in Peru. It was spoken in the area of the tributaries to the right bank of the Napo River, in the Escuelacocha region.

References

Extinct languages of South America
Zaparoan languages